Maharaja Krishna Rasgotra (born 11 September 1924), often shortened to M. K. Rasgotra, is an Indian diplomat and academic who served as the 12th Foreign Secretary of India from 1 May 1982 to 31 January 1985.

Early life
He was born 11 September 1924 in a Dogra-Brahmin family from Shakargarh, Jammu and Kashmir. He was the second son out of three sons and two daughters. He received a Master of Arts degree in English from Punjab University.

Career

Early career 
Rasgotra was tutor at Government College, Lahore from 1944 to 1946, head of the English department at SA College for Women, Sialkot in 1946, and head of the English department at Arya College, Ludhiana in 1947. He was appointed to the Punjab Educational Service in March 1948 and also worked as a lecturer in English at the Satish Chander Dhawan Government College in 1948 and 1949.

He was appointed to the Indian Foreign Service on 27 September 1949. Later in his career, he was High Commissioner of India to the United Kingdom and Ambassador to Morocco, Tunisia, the Netherlands, Nepal, France, and UNESCO.

Bhopal disaster

He was the foreign secretary during the Bhopal disaster. It is claimed by the then-Deputy Chief of Mission of the Embassy of the United States in New Delhi in 1984, in an interview with a news channel, that communications between the government of India and himself relating to the release of Warren Anderson went through the Foreign Secretary. In a subsequent interview with Karan Thapar, Rasgotra held that releasing Warren Anderson was the right thing to do, since he had been earlier promised safe passage.

Later life
In September 2020, it was noted that Rasgotra was still active and was one of the oldest living former Indian Foreign Service (IFS) officers.

Books 

 A Life in Diplomacy, Viking, 2016; Penguin Books, 2019.

References 

1924 births
Living people
Indian Foreign Secretaries
Recipients of the Padma Bhushan in civil service
High Commissioners of India to the United Kingdom
Ambassadors of India to Nepal
Ambassadors of India to Morocco
Ambassadors of India to Tunisia
Ambassadors of India to France
Ambassadors of India to the Netherlands